Craig Cooke (born 28 December 1984) is a Welsh racing cyclist. Cooke is the son of Tony and Denise Cooke, and the younger brother of Nicole Cooke.

Palmarès

2000
3rd British National Cyclo-cross Championships - Junior

2001
3rd British National Cyclo-cross Championships - Junior

2002
3rd British National Road Race Championships - Junior
3rd Junior Tour of Wales

2004
2nd Welsh National Cyclo-cross Championships

References

External links

1984 births
Living people
Welsh male cyclists
Sportspeople from the Vale of Glamorgan